Aasai Manaivi is a 1977 Indian Tamil-language film directed by K. Sornam, and produced by Mayuram Soundar. The film stars Jaishankar and Sujatha. It was released on 27 August 1977.

Plot 
Kanan is a milk vendor living in a village. To teach a lesson to the village headman's arrogant daughter, he marries her upon becoming a movie star. Kanan takes various steps to tame his shrew wife, ultimately succeeding, and the couple amicably resolve their differences.

Cast 
Male cast
 Jaishankar
 Jayachandran
 Thengai Srinivasan

Female cast
 Sujatha
 Bhavani
 Manorama

Production 
Aasai Manaivi was directed by K. Sornam, who also wrote the screenplay based on a story by Ravindar. The film was produced by Mayuram Soundar under the production company Surialaya Productions.

Soundtrack 
The soundtrack was composed by the duo Shankar–Ganesh, while the lyrics were written by Kannadasan, Vaali and A. Maruthakasi.

References

External links 
 

1970s Tamil-language films
1977 drama films
1977 films
Films directed by K. Sornam
Films scored by Shankar–Ganesh
Indian drama films